UKA is the largest cultural festival in Norway and is held biannually by volunteer students from Trondheim. In 2019, the festival is set to be held for the 50th time. In 2015, 1700 students did volunteer work, while 90,000 event tickets were sold. The name "UKA" translates to "the week", although it now lasts for the better part of a month, with events including concerts, theatre, seminars and more.

History

UKA was established in 1917 by students studying at the Norwegian Institute of Technology (NTH, now part of NTNU) in an attempt to improve the financial situation within the students' community in
Trondheim. In 1917, the festival mainly consisted of a revue, which was arranged every other year except the mid-war
years. Starting with scarce resources, UKA has been in constant growth and is today the largest Norwegian cultural festival with more concerts and entertainment than ever before. Although the festival now features big-name artists, the organizers still consider revue, UKErevyen, as the "heart" of the festival.

Volunteer work
It may seem hard to believe, but Norway's largest cultural festival is run entirely by volunteers, from top to bottom. Trondheim's tradition for volunteer work is well known, and a trademark for UKA. In 2009, 1400 volunteers made sure everything ran smoothly. 6500 spectators jumped up and down in Death Valley, 90 000 litres of beer were sold during the festival, activities spanning from juggling courses to crime night to wrestling were held in Death Valley and The Student Society in Trondheim, and commercial partners contributed with events like “UKA robot challenge”, where the contesters competed in building and programming Lego robots. The festival itself is a celebration of intellectual prowess and passionate commitment shown by the students. Consisting mainly of students recruited from Trondheim, the main audience is young people within the proximity of the city. There are events and lectures, however, that targets a more mature audience, such as UKErevyen.

Names
Every UKErevyen revue is given a name, which also becomes the name of the entire festival. The name is decided by the writers and is a well-kept secret all the way up to the opening of the festival and the play, and only a handful of people outside of the writers' collegium knows it before it's officially revealed. This is a big event where the name is physically uncovered at midnight in front of the student society, with several thousand attendants.

The writers aren't entirely free in choosing the name, either. A more or less strict set of rules applies, never written down, but followed from one festival to the next. The most important ones are that the name should consist of three syllables, and that it should have several meanings, either in splitting up the word(s) or rearranging the letters. The rules aren't always followed, as seen with the name of UKA-03; Glasur, that had only two syllables. It did, however, supply different interpretations, first of all with the word itself, meaning glaze, then "Gla' sur" which means "happy sad", and "gla'rus" (a rush of happiness). UKA-05 restored the rule of three syllables with the name Origo.

List of names

Headliners

UKA-17:
 Martin Garrix
 Future
 Highasakite
 Lorde
 Cashmere Cat

UKA-15:
 The Prodigy
 Major Lazer + Matoma
 Wiz Khalifa + A$ap Rocky
 Mew
 Diplo
 Lemaitre
 Kings Of Convenience
 Kakkmaddafakka

UKA-13:

 Calvin Harris
 The National + The Tallest Man On Earth
 Macklemore & Ryan Lewis 
 Röyksopp + Susanne Sundfør (+ special guest: Robyn)
 Mac Miller
 Kavinsky

UKA-11:
 David Guetta
 Snoop Dogg
 Robyn
 Antony and The Johnsons
 White Lies
 Crystal Fighters

UKA-09:
 Jay-Z
 Franz Ferdinand
 Aqua
 The Eagles of Death Metal

UKA-07
 Muse
 Pussycat Dolls
 Travis
 Kings of Convenience

UKA-05
 The Dandy Warhols
 De La Soul
 Kaizers Orchestra
 Seigmen
 Tom McRae
 Wyclef Jean
 Chippendales

Former UKA festivals have included:
 50 Cent
 a-ha
 The Cardigans
 Dum Dum Boys
 Public Enemy
 Turbonegro
 The Prodigy
 Oktoberfest

See also

 Studentersamfundet i Trondhjem
 Norwegian University of Science and Technology
 The International Student Festival in Trondheim

References

External links
  UKA's home page

Student events
Festivals in Trondheim
Music festivals established in 1917
Autumn events in Norway
1917 establishments in Norway